Lassina Diarra is a Malian professional footballer who plays as a forward for AS Bakaridjan.

International career
In January 2014, coach Djibril Dramé invited him to be a part of the Mali squad for the 2014 African Nations Championship. He helped the team to the quarter finals where they lost to Zimbabwe by two goals to one.

References

Living people
Mali international footballers
Malian footballers
2014 African Nations Championship players
1989 births
Place of birth missing (living people)
Association football forwards
21st-century Malian people
Mali A' international footballers